Khariar Road railway station is one of the important railway station located in Indian state of Odisha in Nuapada district. Its built on the East Coast Railway network  It serves Khariar Road town. Its code is KRAR. It has three platforms. Passenger, Express and Superfast trains halts at Khariar Road railway station. It is 10 km away from Nuapada Railway station.

Major trains

 Durg–Jagdalpur Express
 Korba–Visakhapatnam Express
 Gandhidham–Puri Weekly Superfast Express
 Puri–Ajmer Express
 Puri–Ahmedabad Express
 Puri–Ahmedabad Weekly Express
 Puri–Durg Express
 Samata Express
 Puri–Sainagar Shirdi Express
 Lokmanya Tilak Terminus–Puri Superfast Express
 Bilaspur–Tirupati Express
 Visakhapatnam–Bhagat Ki Kothi Express
 Visakhapatnam–Lokmanya Tilak Terminus Superfast Express

References

See also
 Nuapada district

Railway stations in Nuapada district
Sambalpur railway division